Norwood House is a historic home located near Lewes, Sussex County, Delaware. It was built about 1850, and is two-story, three-bay, single-pile, frame house.  It has a rectangular plan and sits on a brick foundation.  The house is sheathed in weatherboard with cornerboards and has a shingled gable roof. A single story section extends down the entire length of the rear of the house and there is an earlier one-story section located on the north rear. Also on the property is a contributing privy.  It is a virtually unaltered survivor of Belltown, a 19th-century "free colored" community.

It was added to the National Register of Historic Places in 1982.

References

Houses on the National Register of Historic Places in Delaware
Houses completed in 1850
Houses in Sussex County, Delaware
Nanticoke tribe
National Register of Historic Places in Sussex County, Delaware